Clarence Burton (1882–1933) was an American actor.

Clarence Burton may also refer to:

Clarence G. Burton (1886–1982), American politician
Clarence M. Burton (1853–1932), American lawyer, businessman, historian and philanthropist